Middleton One Row is a village in the borough of Darlington and the ceremonial county of County Durham, England. The village was originally developed as a spa resort in the late 18th century with properties developed on one row, overlooking the banks of the River Tees.

History 
The village and neighbouring Middleton St George, unlike other places of the name, is not from Old English middel "middle" and tun "farm". Instead, the name is from Old English mycel "large (compare "much")" + tun "farm". The name was recorded as Micletone in 1148.

Governance 
Middleton One Row falls within the Sedgefield parliamentary constituency which is under the control of the Conservative Party. The current Member of Parliament, since the 2019 general election, is Paul Howell.

The village falls under the Sadberge and Middleton St. George ward of Darlington Borough Council, the parish council holds monthly meetings in the local community centre.

Community and culture 
The village contains a pub and restaurant called The Devonport and a former church, St Laurence's was owned by the Church of England and dated back to 1871, however it was officially closed in 2012 after structural difficulties and high repair costs, it has now been converted into a luxury home.

References

External links

Villages in County Durham
Places in the Borough of Darlington
Places in the Tees Valley